Gorzów Śląski  is a town in Olesno County, Opole Voivodeship, Poland, with 2,452 inhabitants (2019).

Notable people
Nathanael Pringsheim (1823–1894), Jewish German botanist
Herbert Weichmann (1896–1983), Jewish German politician

Twin towns – sister cities
See twin towns of Gmina Gorzów Śląski.

References

External links
 Jewish Community in Gorzów Śląski on Virtual Shtetl

Olesno County
Cities in Silesia
Cities and towns in Opole Voivodeship
Shtetls